Saša Vasiljević (born March 23, 1979) is a retired professional basketball player. He represented Bosnia and Herzegovina internationally.

Professional career

Vasiljević signed with ViveMenorca of the Spanish League in February 2007, replacing Rod Brown, who had been released, and he made his debut with them on February 3, 2007.

In July 2008, he signed a one-year deal with Greek team Kolossos Rodou. After good season with them he extended his contract for one more season.

In July 2010, he signed a one-year deal with Donetsk. In June 2011, he signed with Khimik Yuzhny. He left them in December 2011. Later that month he signed with Ikaros Kallitheas till the end of the season.

For 2012–13 season he signed with Politekhnika-Halychyna. In August 2013, he signed with Greek team AENK.

In August 2013, he signed with Greek team Koroivos Amaliadas.

Honors
Club Honors
 Adriatic League Champion: (2005)
 Bosnian League Champion: (2006)

Pro career statistics
 Correct as of 23 June 2007:

References

External links

EuroCup Profile
 Eurobasket.com Profile
 Greek League Profile 
 Spanish League Profile  
 Adriatic League Profile

1979 births
Living people
ABA League players
AEK B.C. players
BC Donetsk players
BC Politekhnika-Halychyna players
Bosnia and Herzegovina men's basketball players
Bosnia and Herzegovina expatriate basketball people in Serbia
Greek Basket League players
Ikaros B.C. players
KK Hemofarm players
KK Sloga players
KK Srem players
Kolossos Rodou B.C. players
Koroivos B.C. players
Liga ACB players
Menorca Bàsquet players
Nea Kifissia B.C. players
Point guards
Serbs of Bosnia and Herzegovina
Serbs of Croatia
Sportspeople from Osijek